is the debut single by pop girl group Idoling!!!. It was released both as a normal single, and a limited edition CD+DVD. Each copy of the normal edition contains 20 special trading cards. The DVD edition contains the Ganbare Otome (Warai) PV, as well as a special program, containing images of the girls in swimsuits. The single reached a peak of #13 on the Oricon weekly charts, and charted for eight weeks. The third track, "Hyakkaryōran Idoling!!!", was used as the image song of the Odaiba School 2008 Culture Festival. "Friend" was used as an ending theme of the anime Reborn!.

Track listings

CD
 
 "Friend"
 
 
(Note: This can be translated in many different ways - as many flowers blooming simultaneously, a gathering of beautiful women, or a simultaneous emergence of many talents.)

DVD

References

External links
 Pony Canyon - Ganbare Otome (Warai)/friend (Limited Edition With DVD) : Idoling!!!
 Pony Canyon - Ganbare Otome (Warai)/friend (Normal Edition) : Idoling!!!

2007 singles
Idoling!!! songs
2007 songs
Pony Canyon singles